Fathom was a cruise travel experience brand owned by Carnival Corporation & plc and a former cruise line. It was registered in the United Kingdom, and based in Doral, Florida. The line was designed to operate in the "social impact travel" market. Fathom later used other ships within the Carnival Corporation to operate its cruises. In its short time as a cruise line, Fathom made history as they marked the return of cruises from the United States to Cuba following the improvement of relations with Cuba and the United States.

History

Fathom was initially established by Carnival as a cruise line on June 4, 2015, to operate "social impact travel" journeys lasting seven days from PortMiami, Florida, to the Dominican Republic. The journeys included volunteer activities with established organizations on the ground.

On May 2, 2016, Adonia docked in the port of Havana, the first port of her Cuban itinerary for Fathom. It marked the first time in over 50 years that a U.S. cruise line has sailed from the U.S. to Cuba. It was also the first time in decades that Cuban-born individuals were able to travel by sea to or from Cuba.

In November 2016, it was announced that Fathom would discontinue cruise line operations in June 2017, while the name continued as a branded experience on other Carnival cruise lines including AIDA Cruises, Carnival Cruise Lines, Costa Cruises, Holland America Line, Princess Cruises, and P&O Cruises. The MV Adonia, its only ship, was returned to P&O Cruises. The last announced voyages with Fathom took place on six Princess cruises in 2018.

On January 8, 2019, the Fathom brand was quietly discontinued. Upon the brand's discontinuation, the website was shut down and redirected visitors to Carnival's Global Impact page until the domain expired. No further announcements have been made about the future of Fathom.

Management
Fathom's president was Tara Russell, an entrepreneur who founded Create Common Good, a nonprofit enterprise that provides food service job training to help at-risk people become self-sufficient. Russell is the global impact lead for Carnival, working with its 10 cruise line brands on social impact strategies. In that role, she reported directly to Arnold Donald.

Former fleet

References

External links

Official Website (Archived From The Wayback Machine)

2015 establishments in Florida
2019 disestablishments in Florida
American companies established in 2015
American companies disestablished in 2019
Carnival Corporation & plc
Defunct cruise lines
Transport companies established in 2015
Transport companies disestablished in 2019